Black Hills is a 1929 American silent Western film directed by Norman Dawn and starring Katherine Dawn, George Fisher and George Chandler. It was shot on location in South Dakota from April 1928.

Plot
Edith Budwell inherits her father's lumber business, but discovers that a series of fires are being started by a rival company with the connivance of a crooked foreman. She goes undercover posing as a Swedish cook in order to gather enough evidence to expose them.

Cast
Katherine Dawn as Edith Bidwell
George Fisher as Jack Merritt
Bob Webster as Dude McGee
Aldine Webb as Lizzie McGee
George Chandler as Soopy
Roy Dow as Dick

References

Bibliography

External links

1929 Western (genre) films
1920s English-language films
American silent feature films
Silent American Western (genre) films
Films directed by Norman Dawn
American black-and-white films
Films shot in South Dakota
Films set in South Dakota
1920s American films